Bergen was a city that existed in Hudson County, New Jersey, United States, from 1855 to 1870.

History
Bergen was originally incorporated as a town by an Act of the New Jersey Legislature on March 24, 1855, from portions of Bergen Township. In 1862, it did a reverse takeover, absorbing the remaining portions of Bergen Township. On April 14, 1863, portions of the town were taken to form Greenville Township. Bergen was reincorporated as the City of Bergen on March 11, 1868:

On May 2, 1870, both Bergen City and Hudson City were annexed by Jersey City. Bergen City roughly corresponds with the southern part of Journal Square and the Bergen-Lafayette neighborhoods.

References

Former cities in New Jersey
Former towns in New Jersey
Former municipalities in Hudson County, New Jersey
History of Jersey City, New Jersey
1855 establishments in New Jersey